This is a list of Rulers of the Mossi State of Tenkodogo.  Comprising part of Burkina Faso, Tenkodogo is the senior Mossi State.

Naaba = Ruler

Sources 
 www.rulers.org

See also 
 Burkina Faso
 Mossi states
 Rulers of the Mossi state of Gurunsi
 Rulers of the Mossi state of Gwiriko
 Rulers of the Mossi state of Liptako
 Rulers of the Mossi state of Wogodogo
 Rulers of the Mossi state of Yatenga
 Rulers of the Gurma Mossi state of Bilanga
 Rulers of the Gurma Mossi state of Bilayanga
 Rulers of the Gurma Mossi state of Bongandini
 Rulers of the Gurma Mossi state of Con
 Rulers of the Gurma Mossi state of Macakoali
 Rulers of the Gurma Mossi state of Nungu
 Rulers of the Gurma Mossi state of Piela
 Lists of office-holders

Tenkodogo